A list of films produced in France in 1962.

See also
 1962 in France
 1962 in French television

Notes

External links
 French films of 1962 at the Internet Movie Database
French films of 1962 at Cinema-francais.fr

1962
Films
Lists of 1962 films by country or language